Acremoniella is a genus of fungus with unknown family.

The genus was first described by Pier Andrea Saccardo in 1886.

The genus has cosmopolitan distribution.

Species:
 Acremoniella alascensis R.Sprague
 Acremoniella atra (Corda) Sacc.

References

Hypocreales incertae sedis
Hypocreales genera